William Mason Brown (1828–1898) was an American artist.

Early life
Born in Troy, New York.

Education
Brown began his career as a portraitist, studying under Abel Buell Moore, Troy’s preferred portraitist.

Career
Brown painted portraits, landscapes, and trompe-l'œil still lifes.

One of the better known of the Hudson River School’s second generation, he was renowned for romantic landscapes and still lifes.

He was influenced by Thomas Cole and others of the first generation of the Hudson River’s School, Brown was also heavily influenced by the Pre-Raphaelite's.

In 1850, he moved to Newark, New Jersey, and began specializing in landscape painting.

In 1858, he moved to Brooklyn, New York, and switched to painting still lifes.

He exhibited at the National Academy of Design for thirty-one years.

His paintings are to be found at The Brooklyn Museum of Art, the Cleveland Museum of Art, The Corcoran Gallery of Art, and the Pennsylvania Academy of the Fine Arts.

He usually signed his work as Wm M Brown.

Death
In 1898 Brown came down with heatstroke on August 26, and died at his home in Brooklyn, New York on September 2.

Collections
His works are in the following collections:
 Brooklyn Museum of Art

Notes

References

External links

Artwork by William Mason Brown

19th-century American painters
American male painters
American landscape painters
Hudson River School painters
Painters from New York (state)
Trompe-l'œil artists
1828 births
1898 deaths
19th-century American male artists